Fotballklubben Senja is a Norwegian association football club from Silsand, Troms.

The men's team currently plays in the Norwegian Fourth Division, having been relegated from the 2022 Norwegian Third Division.

Recent history 
{|class="wikitable"
|-bgcolor="#efefef"
! Season
! 
! Pos.
! Pl.
! W
! D
! L
! GS
! GA
! P
!Cup
!Notes
|-
|2007
|3. divisjon
|align=right bgcolor=#DDFFDD| 1
|align=right|22||align=right|17||align=right|3||align=right|2
|align=right|100||align=right|33||align=right|54
||First round
|Promoted
|-
|2008
|2. divisjon
|align=right bgcolor="#FFCCCC"| 12
|align=right|26||align=right|6||align=right|2||align=right|18
|align=right|36||align=right|92||align=right|20
||First round
|Relegated
|-
|2009
|3. divisjon
|align=right bgcolor=#DDFFDD| 1
|align=right|22||align=right|19||align=right|2||align=right|1
|align=right|103||align=right|28||align=right|59
||First round
|Promoted
|-
|2010
|2. divisjon
|align=right |8
|align=right|26||align=right|10||align=right|5||align=right|11
|align=right|48||align=right|52||align=right|35
||Second round
|
|-
|2011 
|2. divisjon
|align=right |5
|align=right|26||align=right|14||align=right|2||align=right|10
|align=right|57||align=right|66||align=right|44
||Second round
|
|-
|2012 
|2. divisjon
|align=right |3
|align=right|26||align=right|15||align=right|5||align=right|6
|align=right|54||align=right|44||align=right|50
||First round
|
|-
|2013
|2. divisjon
|align=right bgcolor="#FFCCCC"| 14
|align=right|26||align=right|6||align=right|2||align=right|18
|align=right|41||align=right|58||align=right|20
||First round
|Relegated
|-
|2014
|3. divisjon
|align=right bgcolor=#DDFFDD| 1
|align=right|22||align=right|17||align=right|4||align=right|1
|align=right|75||align=right|16||align=right|55
||First round
|Promoted
|-
|2015
|2. divisjon
|align=right | 10
|align=right|26||align=right|9||align=right|3||align=right|14
|align=right|48||align=right|59||align=right|30
||Third round
|
|-
|2016
|2. divisjon
|align=right bgcolor="#FFCCCC"| 9
|align=right|26||align=right|7||align=right|8||align=right|11
|align=right|34||align=right|41||align=right|29
||Second round
|Relegated
|-
|2017
|3. divisjon
|align=right |2
|align=right|26||align=right|17||align=right|0||align=right|9
|align=right|63||align=right|33||align=right|51
||First round
|
|-
|2018
|3. divisjon
|align=right bgcolor=#DDFFDD| 1
|align=right|26||align=right|18||align=right|4||align=right|4
|align=right|63||align=right|23||align=right|58
||Second round
|Promoted
|-
|2019
|2. divisjon
|align=right |11
|align=right|26||align=right|7||align=right|6||align=right|13
|align=right|31||align=right|47||align=right|27
||First round
|
|-
|2020
|2. divisjon
|align=right |13
|align=right|13||align=right|2||align=right|3||align=right|8
|align=right|13||align=right|33||align=right|8
|Cancelled
|
|-
|2021
|2. divisjon
|align=right bgcolor="#FFCCCC"| 14
|align=right|26||align=right|2||align=right|5||align=right|19
|align=right|22||align=right|65||align=right|11
|Second round
|Relegated
|-
|2022
|3. divisjon
|align=right bgcolor="#FFCCCC"| 14
|align=right|26||align=right|5||align=right|4||align=right|17
|align=right|33||align=right|80||align=right|19
|First round
|Relegated
|}
Source:

References

External links
Official site
Senja Stadion - Nordic Stadiums

Football clubs in Norway
Association football clubs established in 1949
Sport in Troms
1949 establishments in Norway
Senja